Mamula may refer to:

 Mamula (island), an islet in Montenegro

People
 Branko Mamula (1921–2021), Serbian admiral in Yugoslav service
 , Slavic Lazar Mamula, general of the Austrian Empire
 Mike Mamula, American football player
 Nada Mamula, Serbian singer

Serbian surnames